While You're Over There in No Man's Land, I'm Over Here in Lonesome Land is a World War I song written by Jessie Spiess and composed by Jack Stanley. The song was first published in 1918 by Will Rossiter in Chicago, Il. The sheet music cover, illustrated by Starmer, features a woman knitting with a battle scene above.

The sheet music can be found at the Pritzker Military Museum & Library.

References 

Bibliography
Parker, Bernard S. World War I Sheet Music. Vol 2 Jefferson: McFarland & Company, Inc., 2007. . 
Rubin, Richard. 2014. The last of the doughboys: the forgotten generation and their forgotten World War. . 
Vogel, Frederick G. World War I Songs: A History and Dictionary of Popular American Patriotic Tunes, with Over 300 Complete Lyrics. Jefferson: McFarland & Company, Inc., 1995. . 

1918 songs
Songs of World War I
Songs written by Jessie Spiess